LeiLanni Nesbeth (born 17 July 2001) is a Bermudian footballer who plays as a forward and a midfielder for American college team Florida State Seminoles and the Bermuda women's national team.

Early life and education
Nesbeth was raised in the St. David's Island. She attended the Bedes Senior School in England.

College career
Nesbeth attended the Florida State University in the United States.

Club career
Nesbeth has played for Brighton & Hove Albion in England.

International career
Nesbeth represented Bermuda at the 2018 CONCACAF Women's U-17 Championship and the 2020 CONCACAF Women's U-20 Championship. She capped at senior level during the 2022 CONCACAF W Championship qualification.

Honours 
Florida State Seminoles
 NCAA Division I Women's Soccer Championship: 2021

See also
List of Bermuda women's international footballers

References

External links

2001 births
Living people
People from St. George's Parish, Bermuda
Bermudian women's footballers
Women's association football forwards
Women's association football midfielders
Brighton & Hove Albion W.F.C. players
Florida State Seminoles women's soccer players
Women's Championship (England) players
Bermuda women's international footballers
Bermudian expatriate footballers
Bermudian expatriate sportspeople in England
Expatriate women's footballers in England
Bermudian expatriate sportspeople in the United States
Expatriate women's soccer players in the United States
Women's basketball players
Bermudian women cricketers